The Hollies' Greatest Hits is the name of:

The Hollies' Greatest Hits (1967 album) (North America)
The Hollies' Greatest Hits (1968 West German album)
The Hollies' Greatest Hits (1973 album)

See also
Hollies' Greatest (1968 album)
Hollies' Greatest (US version) (1980 album)
 Hollies (album)

Hollies Greatest Hits